Phthalocyanine green G, which has many commercial names, is a synthetic green pigment from the group of phthalocyanine dyes, a complex of copper(II) with chlorinated phthalocyanine. It is a soft green powder, which is insoluble in water. It is a bright, high intensity colour used in oil and acrylic based artist's paints, and in other applications.

Synthesis, properties, and production
Phthalocyanine green is derived from phthalocyanine blue by chlorination in the presence of aluminium trichloride. The stoichiometry for the complete chlorination is shown:
Cu(C32H16N8)  +  16 Cl2   →   Cu(C32N8Cl16)  +  16 HCl

In practice, this pigment is a mixture of isomers and degrees of chlorination.  The 15th and 16th chlorides are difficult to install.  The chemical formula usually ranges from C32H3Cl13CuN8 to  C32HCl15CuN8. 

Due to the presence of strongly electronegative chlorine substituents, the absorption spectrum is shifted from that of the parent copper phthalocyanine. Phthalo green is highly stable and resistant to alkali, acids, solvents, heat, and ultraviolet radiation.

Uses
Due to its stability, phthalo green is used in inks, oil paint, coatings, and many plastics. In application it is transparent. Being insoluble, it has no tendency to migrate in the material. It is a standard pigment used in printing ink and packaging industry. It is also allowed in all cosmetics except those used around the eyes. It is used in some tattoos.

Related compounds
Copper phthalocyanine green 36 is a variant where some of the chlorine atoms are replaced with bromine.  Bromination is less efficient than chlorination.  Consequently the degree of bromination is lower.

See also
 The Joy of Painting - oil paint based on the pigment was frequently used on the show.
 Copper phthalocyanine (blue)
 Lists of colors

References

Pigments
Organic pigments
Phthalocyanines
Shades of green

es:Ftalocianina